Mahmud Barzanji revolts were a series of armed uprisings by Kurdish Sheykh Mahmud Barzanji against the Iraqi authority in newly conquered British Mesopotamia and later the British Mandate in Iraq. Following his first insurrection in May 1919, Sheykh Mahmud was imprisoned and eventually exiled to India for a one-year period. When returning, he was once again appointed a governor, but shortly revolted again declaring himself as the ruler of the Kingdom of Kurdistan. The Kingdom of Kurdistan lasted from September 1922 – July 1924. With British forces greatly exceeding his in ammunition and training, the defeat finally subdued the region to central British Iraqi rule in 1924. Sheykh Mahmud retreated into mountains, and eventually reached terms with the independent Kingdom of Iraq in 1932, over his return from the underground. Sheykh Mahmud revolts are considered the first chapter of the modern Iraqi–Kurdish conflict.

Background
Shortly after the final accords of World War I, the Sheykh of the Qadiriyya order of Sufis, the most influential personality in Iraqi Kurdistan, was appointed Governor of the former sanjak of Duhok.

1919 Kurdish revolt

Sheykh Mahmud's exile
Sheykh Mahmud Barzanji was arrested and sent into exile to India in 1921. Mahmud's fighters continued to oppose British rule after his arrest. Although no longer organized under one leader, this intertribal force was "actively anti-British", engaging in hit-and-run attacks, killing British military officers, and participating in another – left the Turkish ranks to join the Kurdish army.

1922 Kurdish revolt

After the Treaty of Sèvres, which settled some territories, Sulaymaniyah still remained under the direct control of the British High Commissioner. After the subsequent penetration of the Turkish "Özdemir" Detachment into the area, an attempt was made by the British to counter this by appointing Sheykh Mahmud, who was returned from his exile, as Governor once again, on 14 September 1922.

The Sheykh revolted again and in November declared himself King of the Kingdom of Kurdistan. Members of his cabinet included:. The army of the Kingdom of Kurdistan was called the Kurdish National Army.

Barzanji was defeated by the British in July 1924. After the British government finally defeated Sheykh Mahmud, they signed Iraq over to King Faisal I and a new Arab-led government. In January 1926, the League of Nations gave the mandate over the territory to Mandatory Iraq, with the provision for special rights for Kurds.

Aftermath
Following the defeat Sheykh Mahmud retreated into the mountains. In 1930–1931, Sheykh Mahmud Barzanji made his last unsuccessful attempt to gain power.

He later signed a peace accord with the new Iraqi government, returning from the underground to the independent Iraq in 1932.

See also
 RAF Iraq Command
 List of modern conflicts in the Middle East

References

Kingdom of Kurdistan
1919 in Iraq
1922 in Iraq
1923 in Iraq
1924 in Iraq
Conflicts in 1919
Conflicts in 1922
Conflicts in 1923
Conflicts in 1924
Kurdish rebellions in Iraq
Wars involving Iraq